Henry Gold Danforth (June 14, 1854 – April 8, 1918) was a U.S. Representative from New York.

Born in the town of Gates, New York (now part of Rochester), Danforth attended private schools in Rochester, New York, and Phillips Exeter Academy, Exeter, New Hampshire.
He graduated from the collegiate department of Harvard University in 1877 and from the law department in 1880.
He was admitted to the bar in 1880 and commenced practice in Rochester.
He served as director of the Rochester General Hospital 1889-1918.
He served as member of the board of managers of the New York State Reformatory, Elmira, New York from 1900 to 1902.
Trustee of the Reynolds Library 1906–1918.

Danforth was elected as a Republican to the Sixty-second, Sixty-third, and Sixty-fourth Congresses (March 4, 1911 – March 3, 1917).
He was an unsuccessful candidate for renomination in 1916.
He resumed the practice of law.
He died in Rochester, New York, April 8, 1918.
He was interred in Mount Hope Cemetery.

References

External links 
 

1854 births
1918 deaths
Harvard Law School alumni
Phillips Exeter Academy alumni
Republican Party members of the United States House of Representatives from New York (state)
19th-century American politicians
People from Monroe County, New York